Elin Maria Magnusson (born 2 June 1982) is a retired Swedish footballer. She played for KIF Örebro DFF and the Sweden women's national football team. A versatile player, who functioned as a central midfielder as well as a left back.

Club career 

Magnusson joined KIF Örebro in 1999 when they were known as Karlslunds IF. She remained loyal to the club and later became captain. After seventeen seasons at the club, 29 goals in 275 league matches and more than 400 matches in all competitions, she retired in November 2015.

International career 

Magnusson made her debut for the senior Sweden team, aged 31, in a 1–1 draw with Brazil on 19 June 2013. She had represented the national team at Under 17 and Under 19 level, then spent several years in the international wilderness. Coach Pia Sundhage named Magnusson in the Sweden squad for UEFA Women's Euro 2013.

References

External links 
 
 National team profile  at SvFF
 
 Club profile
 

Living people
1982 births
Swedish women's footballers
Sweden women's international footballers
Damallsvenskan players
KIF Örebro DFF players
Women's association football midfielders
Sportspeople from Örebro